Jiří Novák was the defending champion but lost in the second round to Julien Boutter.

Younes El Aynaoui won in the final 6–4, 6–4 against Rainer Schüttler.

Seeds

  Yevgeny Kafelnikov (first round)
  Tommy Haas (quarterfinals, retired because of a back muscle strain)
  Thomas Johansson (first round)
  Jiří Novák (second round)
  Guillermo Cañas (withdrew because of a quadriceps muscle strain)
  Younes El Aynaoui (champion)
  Nicolás Lapentti (quarterfinals)
  Fabrice Santoro (first round)

Draw

Finals

Top half

Bottom half

External links
 2002 BMW Open Singles draw

2002 ATP Tour
2002 BMW Open